Luis Misón (c. 26 August 1727 – 13 February 1776) was a Spanish composer.  Born in Mataró, Barcelona, he composed over 100 tonadillas, including Una mesonera y un arriero ("The Hand Maiden and the Hunter", c. 1757), which contains the song "Seguidilla dolorosa de una enamorada" ("Painful song of a girl in love", Los ciegos (1758), and El maestro de baile (1761).

References
 Robert Stevenson. "Misón, Luis." Grove Music Online. Oxford Music Online. 8 Feb. 2009 <http://www.oxfordmusiconline.com/subscriber/article/grove/music/18779> (subscriber only link).
 Robert Stevenson. "Misón, Luis." The New Grove Dictionary of Opera. Ed. Stanley Sadie. Grove Music Online. Oxford Music Online. 8 Feb. 2009 <http://www.oxfordmusiconline.com/subscriber/article/grove/music/O005853> (subscriber only link).

1727 births
1776 deaths
Spanish composers
Spanish male composers
18th-century composers
18th-century male musicians